Victoria Azarenka and Maria Kirilenko were the defending women's doubles champions. Azarenka chose not to participate while Kirilenko played with Nadia Petrova. They were defeated in the quarterfinals by Natalie Grandin and Vladimíra Uhlířová.
Vania King and Yaroslava Shvedova won the title, defeating Natalie Grandin and Vladimíra Uhlířová 6–4, 3–6, [11–9] in the final.

Seeds
The top four seeds received a bye into the second round.

Draw

Finals

Top half

Bottom half

External links
 Main draw

Western and Southern Open
2011 Western & Southern Open

pl:Western & Southern Open 2011 - kobiety